Major David John Croft,  (born David John Andrew Sharland; 7 September 1922 – 27 September 2011) was an English television comedy screenwriter, producer and director. He produced and wrote a string of BBC sitcoms with partners Jimmy Perry and Jeremy Lloyd, including Dad's Army, Are You Being Served?, It Ain't Half Hot Mum, Hi-de-Hi! and 'Allo 'Allo!

Early life
Croft was born into a show business family: his father, Reginald Sharland (1886–1944), had a successful career as a radio actor in Hollywood, and his mother, Annie Croft (1896–1959), was a famous stage actress who had starred in the 1927 silent film On With The Dance, she was also the first woman to own a West End theatre company. His first public appearance was at the age of seven, when he was seen in a commercial which aired in cinemas. After that, his acting career in films "began and ended" with his uncredited appearance as Perkins in the film Goodbye, Mr. Chips (1939).

Croft was educated at two independent schools: at St John's Wood prep school in North London, followed by Rugby School in Warwickshire. The boys attended Sunday services at St. Aldhelm's Church, and Croft later gave that name to the church in Dad's Army.

Military service
He enlisted in the Royal Artillery in 1942.  He served during the Second World War in North Africa, India and Singapore. After contracting rheumatic fever in North Africa, was sent home to convalesce and then underwent officer training at the Royal Military College, Sandhurst.

Croft was posted to India, arriving as the war in Europe ended, and was assigned to the Essex Regiment, rising to the rank of Major. When his military service ended he began working in the entertainment industry, as an actor, singer and writer.

Career
Croft met Freddie Carpenter, who produced many pantomimes for Howard & Wyndham across the UK, resulting in Croft writing scripts such as Aladdin, Cinderella and Babes in the Wood. Through his lifelong friend, composer/conductor Cyril Ornadel, Croft met the producer Fiona Bentley, who had obtained rights to adapt and musicalise a number of Beatrix Potter stories. Croft wrote the scripts and lyrics for a series released on His Master's Voice Junior Record Club, narrated by Vivien Leigh and starring several singer-actors and actresses including Barbara Brown, Graham Stark and Cicely Courtneidge. David Croft himself played a number of roles, including Timmy Willie in Johnny Town-Mouse, Kep in Jemima Puddle-Duck, and Old Brown in Squirrel Nutkin.

Croft relocated to the Northeast of England to work at Tyne Tees Television, where he produced many editions of the variety show The One O'Clock Show. For Tyne Tees, Croft also directed and produced the admags Ned's Shed and Mary Goes to Market, as well as producing his first sitcom, Under New Management, set in a derelict pub in the North of England.

After leaving Tyne Tees Television to work at the BBC in the mid-1960s, he produced several of the Corporation's sitcoms such as Beggar My Neighbour, A World of His Own, Further Up Pompeii! and Hugh and I. It was while producing Hugh and I that he was introduced to actor Jimmy Perry, who handed him an unsolicited script for a pilot called The Fighting Tigers about the British Home Guard during the Second World War. Croft liked the idea. The two men co-wrote nine series of the show, which was retitled Dad's Army, as well as a feature film and a stage show based on it.

While Dad's Army was still running, Croft began to co-write Are You Being Served? with Jeremy Lloyd. He was to continue both writing partnerships for the rest of his career in several hit series including It Ain't Half Hot Mum, Hi-de-Hi! and You Rang M'Lord (with Perry) and 'Allo 'Allo! (with Lloyd). His last full series Oh, Doctor Beeching!, broadcast from 1995 to 1997, was co-written with Richard Spendlove. He created a television pilot in 2007, entitled Here Comes The Queen, with Jeremy Lloyd. This starred Wendy Richard and Les Dennis, but the show was not continued as a series. Of these, It Ain't Half Hot Mum "was David’s and my favourite", Jimmy Perry told journalist Neil Clark for a Daily Telegraph article in 2013.

As a producer, Croft's regular practice was to signal the end of an episode with the caption "You have been watching ...", followed by shots of the main cast.

Personal life
Croft married theatrical agent Ann Callender on 2 June 1952; the couple had seven children and sixteen grandchildren. In 1986, one daughter, Rebecca, married Simon Cadell, a star of Croft's comedy Hi-de-Hi!.

Croft was the subject of This Is Your Life in 1995 when he was surprised by Michael Aspel outside BBC Television Centre.

David Croft died in his sleep at his home in Portugal on 27 September 2011. He was 89 years old. His widow Ann died on 11 June 2016.

Awards and honours
Croft became an Officer of The Most Excellent Order of the British Empire with Jimmy Perry in 1978 for services to television.  He also received the 1981 Desmond Davis award from the British Academy of Film and Television Arts, for his outstanding contributions to the industry.

Croft's awards include:
(BAFTA awards): Best Light EntertainmentNominated: 1970 Dad's ArmyBest Light Entertainment Production1971 Dad's Army (With Team)Nominated: 1971 Up Pompeii!Best Situation Comedy SeriesNominated: 1973 Dad's ArmyNominated: 1974 Dad's ArmyBest Situation Comedy Nominated: 1975 Dad's Army Nominated: 1977 Are You Being Served?Desmond Davis Award1982 Lifetime Achievement AwardBest Comedy SeriesNominated: 1982 Hi-de-Hi!Nominated: 1983 Hi-de-Hi!Nominated: 1985 Hi-de-Hi!Nominated: 1986 'Allo 'Allo!Nominated: 1987 'Allo 'Allo!Nominated: 1988 'Allo 'Allo!Nominated: 1989 'Allo 'Allo!
 (British Comedy Awards): 2003 Lifetime Achievement AwardWriters' Guild of Great Britain 1969 Best Comedy Script Dad's Army 1970 Best Comedy Script Dad's Army 1971 Best Comedy Script Dad's Army

Production and writing career
In addition to writing most of the episodes of these television series, Croft also worked as producer, director and, later, executive producer.

Written with Jimmy Perry
1968–1977 Dad's Army
1974–1981 It Ain't Half Hot Mum
1980–1988 Hi-de-Hi!
1988–1993 You Rang, M'Lord?

Written with Jeremy Lloyd
1972–1985 Are You Being Served? 
1977–1978 Come Back Mrs Noah
1980 Oh Happy Band!
1982–1992 'Allo 'Allo! (Series 1–6)
1992–1993 Grace and Favour
1994 Which Way to the War
2008 Here Comes the Queen

Written with Richard Spendlove 
 1995-1997 Oh, Doctor Beeching!

Written by himself
1972 Birds in the Bush

References

Bibliography

External links
Official Homepage

List of works at the BBC Guide to Comedy 
Biography at UKTV 
Obituary of David Croft, The Daily Telegraph, 27 September 2011
Obituary of David Croft, The Guardian, 27 September 2011

1922 births
2011 deaths
BBC television producers
British Army personnel of World War II
 
English comedy writers
English television directors
English television producers
English television writers
Essex Regiment officers
Graduates of the Royal Military College, Sandhurst
Officers of the Order of the British Empire
People educated at Rugby School
People from Poole
Royal Artillery soldiers
Military personnel from Dorset